Donja Zdenčina is a village in the Zagreb County, Croatia. The settlement is administered as a part of Klinča Sela municipality.
At the 2011 national census, population of the settlement was 1,009.

Sources

Populated places in Zagreb County